Alan Patrick (born July 9, 1983), is a Brazilian mixed martial artist who competes in the lightweight division. A professional MMA competitor since 2008, Patrick made a name for himself fighting in his home country of Brazil and the Ultimate Fighting Championship (UFC). He is a former Bitetti Combat Lightweight champion.

Background
Patrick was born in Jacareí, São Paulo, Brazil, but grew up mostly in Brasília. Patrick has five brothers. As a consequence of alcoholic parents and disturbing household, Patrick grew up mostly in the streets.

He was interested in combat sports, but never had the money to afford training until he was introduced to a Capoeira gym that allowed him train for free and even fed him. Being successful in the sport, he gradually picked up Brazilian jiu-jitsu in the academy he also slept. Trying to follow his idol's – Ronaldo Souza's – footsteps, Patrick eventually moved to Rio de Janeiro to train mixed martial arts at the X-Gym.

Mixed martial arts career

Early career
Patrick began his professional MMA career in his native Brazil in 2008.  He fought for a variety of promotions including Jungle Fight and Bitetti Combat, amassing an undefeated record of 10 wins and no losses.

Ultimate Fighting Championship
After winning Bitetti Combat Lightweight Championship, Patrick made his UFC debut against Garett Whiteley on October 10, 2013, at UFC Fight Night: Maia vs. Shields. He won the fight via TKO due to punches.

He later faced John Makdessi on February 1, 2014, at UFC 169, his first fight outside Brazil. He won the fight via controversial unanimous decision, all major MMA media sites scored the fight either a draw or a win for Makdessi.

Patrick was expected to face Beneil Dariush on October 25, 2014 at UFC 179.  However, Patrick pulled out of the bout with after sustaining a jaw injury and was replaced by Carlos Diego Ferreira.

Patrick faced Mairbek Taisumov on June 20, 2015 at UFC Fight Night 69. He lost the fight via TKO in the second round, the first loss of his professional MMA career.

Patrick was expected to face Chad Laprise on March 20, 2016 at UFC Fight Night 85. However, Laprise was pulled from the matchup with Patrick on March 12 in favor of a bout against Ross Pearson at the event after his initial opponent was scratched. In turn, Patrick faced promotional newcomer Damien Brown. Patrick won the fight via unanimous decision.

Patrick next faced Stevie Ray on September 24, 2016 at UFC Fight Night 95. He won the fight via unanimous decision.

Patrick faced Damir Hadžović on February 3, 2018 at UFC Fight Night 125. He won the fight via unanimous decision.

Patrick used to train in Rio de Janeiro up until this point, but after the fight with Hadžović, he moved to Orlando, Florida to train at Fusion X-cell.

Patrick faced Scott Holtzman on October 6, 2018 at UFC 229. He lost the fight via knockout in the third round after being dropped by a punch and eventually being finished with elbows.

Patrick was expected to face Christos Giagos on April 25, 2020. However, Giagos was pulled from the fight, citing injury, and he was replaced by Frank Camacho. However, on April 9, Dana White, the president of UFC announced that this event was postponed to a future date Instead Patrick was scheduled to face Marc Diakiese on July 18, 2020  at UFC Fight Night 173. However, on June 14, Patrick withdrew from the event for unknown reason and he was replaced by Rafael Fiziev.

Patrick was expected to face Rodrigo Vargas on September 12, 2020 at UFC Fight Night 177. However, Vargas was removed from the card in early September for undisclosed reasons and replaced by Bobby Green. Patrick lost the fight via unanimous decision.

Patrick faced Mason Jones on June 5, 2021 at UFC Fight Night: Rozenstruik vs. Sakai. In the second round, after being poked in the eye accidentally by Jones, Patrick was unable to continue and the bout was declared a No Contest.

A rematch with Jones was scheduled to face Mason Jones on October 23, 2021 at UFC Fight Night 196. However, Patrick withdrew from bout and he was replaced by newcomer David Onama.

Patrick was scheduled to face Michael Johnson on May 7, 2022 at UFC 274.  However, the bout was pushed back one week to UFC on ESPN: Błachowicz vs. Rakić for unknown reasons. He lost the bout after getting knocked unconscious in the second round.

On August 8, 2022, it was announced that Patrick was no longer on the UFC roster.

Personal life
Patrick and his wife, Luana, have a son. They moved to Orlando, Florida from their native Brazil in the summer of 2018.

Titles and accomplishments

Mixed martial arts
Bitetti Combat
Bitetti Combat Lightweight Championship (One time)

Mixed martial arts record 

|-
|Loss
|align=center|15–4 (1)
|Michael Johnson 
|KO (punches)
|UFC on ESPN: Błachowicz vs. Rakić 
| 
|align=center|2
|align=center|3:22
|Las Vegas, Nevada, United States
|
|-
|NC
|align=center|15–3 (1)
|Mason Jones
|NC (accidental eye poke)
|UFC Fight Night: Rozenstruik vs. Sakai
|
|align=center|2
|align=center|2:14
|Las Vegas, Nevada, United States
|
|-
|Loss
|align=center|15–3
|Bobby Green
|Decision (unanimous)
|UFC Fight Night: Waterson vs. Hill
|
|align=center|3
|align=center|5:00
|Las Vegas, Nevada, United States
|
|-
|Loss
|align=center|15–2
|Scott Holtzman
|KO (elbows)
|UFC 229 
|
|align=center|3
|align=center|3:42
|Las Vegas, Nevada, United States
|
|-
|Win
|align=center|15–1 
|Damir Hadžović
|Decision (unanimous)
|UFC Fight Night: Machida vs. Anders 
|
|align=center|3
|align=center|5:00
|Belém, Brazil
|
|-
|Win
|align=center|14–1 
|Stevie Ray
| Decision (unanimous)
|UFC Fight Night: Cyborg vs. Länsberg
|
|align=center| 3
|align=center| 5:00
|Brasília, Brazil
|  
|-
|Win
|align=center|13–1
|Damien Brown
|Decision (unanimous)
|UFC Fight Night: Hunt vs. Mir
|
|align=center|3
|align=center|5:00
|Brisbane, Australia
|
|- 
|Loss
|align=center|12–1
|Mairbek Taisumov
|TKO (head kick and punches)
|UFC Fight Night: Jędrzejczyk vs. Penne
|
|align=center|2
|align=center|1:30
|Berlin, Germany
|
|- 
|Win
|align=center|12–0
|John Makdessi
|Decision (unanimous)
|UFC 169
|
|align=center|3
|align=center|5:00
|Newark, New Jersey, United States
|
|-
|Win
|align=center|11–0
|Garett Whiteley
|TKO (punches)
|UFC Fight Night: Maia vs. Shields
|
|align=center|1
|align=center|3:54
|Barueri, Brazil
|
|-
|Win
|align=center|10–0
|Claudiere Freitas
|Decision (unanimous)
|Bitetti Combat 15
|
|align=center|3
|align=center|5:00
|Rio de Janeiro, Brazil
|
|-
|Win
|align=center|9–0
|Kelles Albuquerque
|Decision (unanimous)
|Bitetti Combat 14
|
|align=center|3
|align=center|5:00
|Rio de Janeiro, Brazil
|
|-
|Win
|align=center|8–0
|Murilo Rosa Filho
|TKO (doctor stoppage)
|Jungle Fight 49
|
|align=center|1
|align=center|5:00
|Rio de Janeiro, Brazil
|
|-
|Win
|align=center|7–0
|Alan Ferreira
|KO (head kick)
|Mr. Cage 7
|
|align=center|2
|align=center|3:23
|Manaus, Brazil
|
|-
|Win
|align=center|6–0
|Michel Silva
|Decision (unanimous)
|Mr. Cage 4
|
|align=center|3
|align=center|5:00
|Manaus, Brazil
|
|-
|Win
|align=center|5–0
|André Batata
|Decision (unanimous)
|Vision Fight
|
|align=center|3
|align=center|5:00
|Boa Vista, Brazil
|
|-
|Win
|align=center|4–0
|Ronald King
|Decision (unanimous)
|Vision Fight
|
|align=center|3
|align=center|5:00
|Boa Vista, Brazil
|
|-
|Win
|align=center|3–0
|Augusto Cesar
|Submission (rear-naked choke)
|Samurai da Selva 1
|
|align=center|1
|align=center|N/A
|Manaus, Brazil
|
|-
|Win
|align=center|2–0
|Wagner Henrique
|Submission (rear-naked choke)
|HTJ: Qualifying
|
|align=center|1
|align=center|2:47
|Manaus, Brazil
|
|-
|Win
|align=center|1–0
|Bruno Augusto
|TKO (punches)
|Hero's The Jungle 2
|
|align=center|1
|align=center|N/A
|Manaus, Brazil
|
|-

See also
 List of male mixed martial artists

References

External links
 
 

Brazilian male mixed martial artists
1983 births
Living people
Lightweight mixed martial artists
Mixed martial artists utilizing capoeira
Mixed martial artists utilizing Brazilian jiu-jitsu
Brazilian practitioners of Brazilian jiu-jitsu
People awarded a black belt in Brazilian jiu-jitsu
Brazilian capoeira practitioners
People from Manaus
Brazilian emigrants to the United States
Ultimate Fighting Championship male fighters
Sportspeople from São Paulo (state)